The 1915 New South Wales Rugby Football League premiership was the eighth season of Sydney’s top-grade rugby league football club competition, Australia’s first. Eight teams from across the city contested during the season, with the Balmain club finishing on top of the ladder to claim the premiership.

Season summary
Even though World War I had broken out across Europe and many players were unavailable, there was a general consensus amongst the public that the rugby league premiership continue. On 8 May in good weather the first matches were played between the eventual top four clubs: In front of a record crowd of 13,000 Glebe defeated defending premiers Easts at the SCG, and at Wentworth Oval Balmain drew 11–all with Newtown. Midway through the season, three clubs had clearly broken ahead of the others: Balmain, Glebe and South Sydney. With South Sydney falling away in the second half of the season, Balmain and Glebe became the two remaining contenders for the title, and they clashed with four rounds to play. In front of 20,000 people, the two clubs played out a memorable match at the Sydney Sports Ground, where Balmain eventually prevailed 12–2 on a cold, rainy day. Balmain were assured their first premiership without the need for a playoff after their close last-round win over South Sydney 7–4.

Balmain went through 1915 undefeated – a feat achieved by only five other teams since. They won the premiership in all three grades. Members of the Balmain first-grade premiership winning side included Bob Craig, Bill Schultz and E. Burnicle.

In 1915, the NSWRFL lost its first ever full-time Secretary Edward Larkin when he was killed in fighting at Gallipoli on 25 April.

Teams
The teams remained unchanged from the 1914 season.

 Annandale
 Balmain, formed on 23 January 1908 at Balmain Town Hall
 Eastern Suburbs, formed on 24 January 1908 at Paddington Town Hall
 Glebe, formed on 9 January 1908
 Newtown, formed on 14 January 1908
 North Sydney, formed on February 7, 1908, at the North Sydney School of Arts in Mount Street
 South Sydney, formed on 17 January 1908 at Redfern Town Hall
 Western Suburbs, formed on 4 February 1908

Ladder

References

External links
 Rugby League Tables - Notes AFL Tables
 Rugby League Tables - Season 1915 AFL Tables
 Premiership History and Statistics RL1908
 1915 - Balmain Breaks Through For First Title RL1908
Results: 1911-20 at rabbitohs.com.au

New South Wales Rugby League premiership
Nswrfl Season